Ormond Beach is a city in Volusia County, Florida, United States. The population was 43,080 at the 2020 census. Ormond Beach lies directly north of Daytona Beach and is a principal city of the Deltona–Daytona Beach–Ormond Beach, FL Metropolitan Statistical Area. The city is known as the birthplace of speed, as early adopters of motorized cars flocked to its hard-packed beaches for yearlong entertainment, since paved roads were not yet commonplace. Ormond Beach lies in Central Eastern Florida.

History

Ormond Beach was once within the domain of the Timucuan Indians. Ormond Beach was frequented by Timacuan Indians, but never truly inhabited until 1643 when Quakers blown off course to the New England area ran ashore. They settled in a small encampment along the Atlantic shore. Early relations with neighboring tribes were fruitful, however, in 1704 a local Timacuan chief, Oseanoha, led a raid of the encampment killing most of the population. In 1708 Spaniards inhabited the area and laid claim until British control began. The city is named for James Ormond I, an Anglo-Irish-Scottish sea captain commissioned by King Ferdinand VII of Spain to bring Franciscan settlers to this part of Florida. Ormond had served Britain and Spain in the Napoleonic Wars as a ship captain, and was rewarded for his services to Spain by King Ferdinand VII. Ormond later worked for the Scottish Indian trade company of Panton, Leslie & Company, and his armed brig was called the Somerset. After returning to Spanish control, in 1821, Florida was acquired from Spain by the United States, but hostilities during the Second Seminole War delayed settlement until after 1842. In 1875, the city was founded as New Britain by inhabitants from New Britain, Connecticut, but would be incorporated in 1880 as Ormond for its early plantation owner.

With its hard, white beach, Ormond became popular for the wealthy seeking relief from northern winters during the Floridian boom in tourism following the Civil War. The St. Johns and Halifax Railway arrived in 1886, and the first bridge across the Halifax River was built in 1887. John Anderson and James Downing Price opened the Ormond Hotel on January 1, 1888. Henry Flagler bought the hotel in 1890 and expanded it to accommodate 600 guests. It would be one in a series of Gilded Age hotels catering to passengers aboard his Florida East Coast Railway, which had purchased the St. Johns & Halifax Railroad. Once a well-known landmark which was listed on the National Register of Historic Places in 1980, the hotel was razed in 1992.

On December 5, 1896, the Nathan F. Cobb, a wooden schooner built in 1890, ran aground on a sandbar off Ormond.

One of Flagler's guests at the Ormond Hotel was his former business partner at the Standard Oil Company, John D. Rockefeller. He arrived in 1914 and after four seasons at the hotel bought an estate called The Casements, that would be Rockefeller's winter home during the latter part of his life. Sold by his heirs in 1939, it was purchased by the city in 1973 and now serves as a cultural center. It is the community's best-known historical structure.

Beginning in 1902, some of the first automobile races were held on the compacted sand from Ormond south to Daytona Beach. Pioneers in the industry, including Ransom Olds with his Pirate Racer, and Alexander Winton, tested their inventions. The American Automobile Association brought timing equipment in 1903 and the area acquired the nickname "The Birthplace of Speed." 
In 1907 Glenn Curtiss set an unofficial world record of 136.36 miles per hour (219.45 km/h), on a 40-horsepower (30 kW) 269 cu in (4,410 cc) Curtiss V-8 motorcycle. Lee Bible, in the record-breaking, but fatal, White Triplex, was less fortunate. Driving on the beach is still permitted on some stretches.

The city was renamed Ormond Beach following a referendum held on April 25, 1950.

Ormond Beach has four downtown riverfront parks and a beachfront park along with 37 other parks and gardens large and small.   The historic shopping district located along Granada Boulevard from A1A to Orchard Street is home to dozens of locally-owned shops and restaurants along with historic and cultural sites.

City officials

Elected

 Bill Partington, mayor     
 Dwight Selby, city commissioner, zone 1     
 Troy Kent, city commissioner, zone 2     
 Susan Persis, city commissioner, zone 3
 Rob Littleton, city commissioner, zone 4

Appointed

 Joyce Shanahan, city manager
 Randy Hayes, city attorney

Notable people

 Paul America, actor
 Adelbert Ames, the last surviving general officer of the Civil War, who died at age 97 in 1933
 Lisa Andersen, pro surfer
 Shirley Chisholm, U.S. Congress member, U.S. presidential candidate
 David Allan Coe, musician
 Phil Dalhausser, 2008 Olympic gold medalist in beach volleyball
 Jacob deGrom, MLB pitcher for the Texas Rangers
 Alan Gustafson, NASCAR Sprint Cup crew chief for Hendrick Motorsports
 Brian Kelley, musician, member of Florida Georgia Line
 Paul LePage, politician
 Frederick Dana Marsh, artist
 John D. Rockefeller, billionaire industrialist
 Freelan Oscar Stanley and Francis Edgar Stanley, co-owners of the Stanley Motor Carriage Company
 Corey Walden, professional basketball player, 2019 Israeli Basketball Premier League MVP
 Harry Wendelstedt, baseball umpire

Sites of interest

Historic places

 Anderson-Price Memorial Library Building
 The Casements
 Dix House
 Bulow Creek State Park
 Ormond Memorial Art Museum and Gardens
 North Peninsula State Park
 Tomoka State Park

Other places

 Ormond Beach Municipal Airport

Geography

Ormond Beach is located at  (29.286405, –81.074882).

Drained by the Tomoka River, Ormond Beach is located on the Halifax River lagoon and the Atlantic Ocean.

Demographics

As of the census of 2000, there were 36,301 people, 15,629 households, and 10,533 families residing in the city. The racial makeup of the city was 94.28% White, 2.75% African American, 0.17% Native American, 1.44% Asian, 0.02% Pacific Islander, 0.31% from other races, and 1.03% from two or more races. Hispanic or Latino of any race were 2.20% of the population.

There were 15,629 households, out of which 23.5% had children under the age of 18 living with them, 55.7% were married couples living together, 8.8% had a female householder with no husband present, and 32.6% were non-families. 27.1% of all households were made up of individuals, and 15.3% had someone living alone who was 65 years of age or older. The average household size was 2.27 and the average family size was 2.75.

In the city, the population was spread out, with 19.2% under the age of 18, 4.5% from 18 to 24, 22.4% from 25 to 44, 26.5% from 45 to 64, and 27.4% who were 65 years of age or older. The median age was 48 years. For every 100 females, there were 87.8 males. For every 100 females age 18 and over, there were 84.7 males.

The median income for a household in the city was $43,364, and the median income for a family was $52,496. Males had a median income of $38,598 versus $26,452 for females. The per capita income for the city was $26,364. About 4.2% of families and 6.1% of the population were below the poverty line, including 7.3% of those under age 18 and 5.0% of those age 65 or over.

Media

Newspapers

 Daytona Beach News-Journal, daily newspaper covering the greater Daytona Beach area
 Hometown News, community newspaper in print on Fridays and daily on the Internet
 "The Ormond Beach Observer", a weekly newspaper published in print on Thursdays and daily online, part of the Observer Media Group

Radio stations

AM

 WELE, 1380 AM, Ormond Beach, News/Talk

FM

 WHOG-FM, 95.7 FM, Ormond Beach, Classic Rock

Economy

Business

Ormond Beach is an active commercial and residential market in the Deltona-Daytona Beach-Ormond Beach MSA. Manufacturers enjoy a healthy business climate and engage in global marketing.

Ormond Beach Business Park and Airpark, a foreign trade zone, is home to 29 companies that provide more than 2,000 jobs.

Recent studies show the workforce to be educated, productive, and competitive with 10 percent underemployed. Seven colleges and universities and the Advanced Technology Center support business needs with career advancement, workforce development, and research. Education, health care, and government are the largest employment sectors within the area.

Among the corporations that call Ormond Beach home are:

 Costa Del Mar Headquarters (eye care products)
 First Green Bank
 Florida Production Engineering (automotive)
 Hawaiian Tropic - Tanning Research Laboratories (skin care products)
 ABB Thomas & Betts/Homac (electrical connectors, utility products)
 Hudson Technologies (deep draw manufacturer)
 Microflex Inc. 
 U.S. Food Service (distributor)
 Vital Aire (health care)

Shopping

 Historic Ormond Beach/Granada Blvd.
 Ormond Mall
 Ormond Town Square
 River Gate Shopping Center
 South Forty Shopping Center
 The Trails Shopping Center
 Wal-Mart Super Center
 Tanger Outlets
 Granada Plaza

References

External links

 City of Ormond Beach official website
 Ormond Beach Chamber of Commerce
 Ormond Beach MainStreet
 Historic Photographs from the Florida State Archives
 
 

 
Populated coastal places in Florida on the Atlantic Ocean
Cities in Volusia County, Florida
Seaside resorts in Florida
Populated places established in 1875
Cities in Florida
Beaches of Volusia County, Florida
Beaches of Florida